The Himalayan Journal is the annual magazine of the Himalayan Club in India.

History and profile
The magazine was established in 1929. The first editor-in-chief was the English geographer Kenneth Mason. He was a surveyor operating from Shimla. Mason later continued editing from England. Subsequent editors were C.W.F. Noyce, H.W. Tobin, and Trevor Braham. In 1960, K. Biswas took over as the first Indian editor. From 1969 to 1979 and from 1987 to 1989 Soli S. Mehta was editor. Since 1990, Harish Kapadia is editor.

Editors 
The following persons have been editor-in-chief of the magazine:
 Kenneth Mason (1929–1940)
 C.W.F. Noyce (1946)
 H.W. Tobin (1947–1957)
 Trevor H. Braham (1958–1959)
 Dr. K. Biswas (1960–1968)
 Soli S. Mehta (1969–1979 and 1987–1989)
 Harish Kapadia (1980–1986, 1990–2014)
Nandini Purandare (2015-present)

References

External links 
 
 Himalayan Index (The Alpine Club)

1929 establishments in India
Annual magazines
Climbing magazines
English-language magazines published in India
Sports magazines published in India
Magazines established in 1929